Atemajac de Brizuela is a small town in the southeast sierra of Jalisco, Mexico, 64 km southwest of Guadalajara, between Highways 80 and 401. Its population in 2014 was 6,367.

The town received some notice in July 2008 in the nationally syndicated American comic strip Gil Thorp as the place to which Milford High baseball player—an undocumented immigrant—Elmer Vargas is deported.

History 
The region was inhabited by Otomi, head Indians. The spiritual conquest was mainly carried out by the Franciscan Juna de Padilla. The town was first in the place called Jaconoxtle and in the first half of the eighteenth century settled on the current site. With the conquest, Atemajac was nestled among the towns of the so-called Province of Ávalos and subsequently the provinces attached to Nueva Galicia were left.

On November 22, 1824, by Art. 9 (which adds the articles of the State Provisional Division Plan) it was decreed: The towns of Atemajac and Juanacatlán will be added to the department of Zacoalco. It belonged to the fourth canton of Sayula and third department of Zacoalco.

On April 25, 1903, by decree 997, the State Congress issued a decree that says: The population of Atemajac de las Tablas, from the 4th Canton of the state, will be referred to as Atemajac de Brizuela. Such designation was in honor of Colonel Miguel Brizuela. Atemajac de Brizuela exists as a municipality since 1884, by decree of April 4 called before Atemajac de las Tablas.

Location 
Atemajac de Brizuela is located south of the state at coordinates 20º05'00 "at 20º16'30" north latitude, and 103º35'00 "at 103º57'20" west longitude, at a height of 2,250 meters above the level from sea.

The municipality of Atemajac de Brizuela borders to the north with the municipalities of Cocula, Villa Corona, Zacoalco de Torres; to the east with the municipalities of Zacoalco de Torres, Techaluta de Montenegro; to the south with the municipalities of Techaluta de Montenegro, Tapalpa and Chiquilistlán; to the west with the municipalities of Chiquilistlán, Tecolotlán and Cocula.

Topography 
The rugged areas (53%) predominate with heights ranging from 2,250 to 2,600 meters above sea level in some of the foothills of the Sierra de Tapalpa. There are also flat areas (30%) with heights of 2,200 to 2,250 meters above sea level and semi-flat areas (17%).

Terrain 

The territory is made up of land belonging to the tertiary period. The composition of the soils is of predominant types Feozem Háplico, Cambisol Chromic and Andosol Mólica. The municipality has a territorial area of 19,157 ha, of which 5,229 are used for agricultural purposes, 3,394 in livestock, 10,361 are for forest use and 173 hectares are urban land. As far as the property is concerned, an extension of 10,604 hectares is private and another of 8,553 hectares is ejidal; There is no communal property.

Hydrography 

The hydrological resources available to the municipality are: the Carrizal River; the streams: Agua Prieta, San Juan and El Salto; there are also several springs.

Weather 
The climate is semi-dry, with dry winter, and mild, with mild winter. The average annual temperature is 19 °C, with a maximum of 26 °C and a minimum of 0 °C. The rainfall regime is recorded in the months of June and July, with an average rainfall of 814.5 millimeters. The annual average of days with frosts is 39. The prevailing winds are in the northwest direction.

Government

Municipal presidents

References

External links
Entry in the Columbia Gazetteer of North America, 2000 at Bartleby.com

Municipalities of Jalisco